Tip Tipping (13 February 1958 – 5 February 1993) was an English film and television stuntman and actor.

Biography
Prior to his career as a stuntman, Tipping served in the Royal Marines and 21st SAS Regiment. He appeared in television series such as Doctor Who, The New Statesman, Bottom, The Bill and Poirot, and films including Never Say Never Again (1983), Batman (1989), Indiana Jones and the Last Crusade (1989) and Aliens (1986, in a credited role as Private Crowe).

Tipping died on 5 February 1993, aged 34, in a parachuting accident at Brunton, near Alnwick, Northumberland, while filming for the BBC documentary series 999. He is interred in the churchyard at the Church of St Peter and St Paul, Wadhurst, East Sussex.

Filmography

References

External links

1958 births
1993 deaths
Accidental deaths in England
English male film actors
English stunt performers
English male television actors
Parachuting deaths
20th-century Royal Marines personnel
Special Air Service soldiers
Place of birth missing
20th-century English male actors